HMS Royal Oak was a 74-gun third rate ship of the line of the Royal Navy, launched on 4 March 1809 at Dudman's yard at Deptford Wharf. Her first commanding officer was Captain Pulteney Malcolm.

Napoleonic Wars

In 1812 Royal Oak was under the command of Captain Thomas George Shortland, who was superseded by Captain Edward Dix in 1813. During this time she was the flagship of Rear-Admiral Lord Amelius Beauclerk, of the Texel.

War of 1812
Royal Oak shared with other vessels in the proceeds of the capture on 17 December 1813 of the American vessel Maria Antoinette.
 
On 1 June 1814 Rear-Admiral Pulteney Malcolm, who had hoisted his flag aboard Royal Oak, proceeded with troops under Brigadier-General Robert Ross to North America. Malcolm accompanied Sir Alexander Cochrane on the expedition up the Chesapeake and regulated the debarkation and embarkation of the troops employed against Washington and Baltimore.

Ross was killed on 12 September 1814 in Baltimore, Maryland, Royal Oak would carry his body to Halifax, Nova Scotia, for interment on 29 September 1814.

In December Royal Oak was with the fleet under Cochrane preparing for the attack on New Orleans. Before the attack, her boats participated in the Battle of Lake Borgne.

Between 12 and 15 December 1814, Captain Lockyer of Sophie led a flotilla of some 50 boats, barges, gigs and launches to attack the US gunboats.

Lockyer deployed the boats in three divisions, of which he led one.  Captain Montresor  of the gun-brig Manly commanded the second, and Captain Roberts of Meteor commanded the third. After rowing for 36 hours, the British met the Americans at St. Joseph's Island. On 13 December 1814, the British attacked the one-gun schooner USS Sea Horse. On the morning of the 14th, the British engaged the Americans in a short, violent battle.

The British captured the entire American force, including the tender, USS Alligator, and five gunboats. The British lost 17 men killed and 77 wounded; Royal Oak had only one man wounded.  then evacuated the wounded. In 1821 the survivors of the flotilla shared in the distribution of head-money arising from the capture of the American gun-boats and sundry bales of cotton. In 1847 the Admiralty issued a clasp (or bar) marked "14 Dec. Boat Service 1814" to survivors of the boat service who claimed the clasp to the Naval General Service Medal.   

In support of the attack on New Orleans, sixty Royal Marines from Royal Oak were disembarked. One of these men was killed in action on 8 January 1815, as a force of marines, sailors, and soldiers of the 85th Regiment of Foot commanded by Colonel William Thornton successfully assaulted American positions on the west bank of the Mississippi. The naval contingent was under the command of Commander Rowland Money, of Trave, who was severely wounded in the attack.

Fate

From 1825 Royal Oak was employed on harbour service, until in 1850 she was broken up.

Notes

References
Citations

Bibliography

Lavery, Brian (2003) The Ship of the Line - Volume 1: The development of the battlefleet 1650-1850. Conway Maritime Press. .

External links
Two Royal Navy Records for Dr. William Todd

Ships of the line of the Royal Navy
Fame-class ships of the line
1809 ships
Ships built in Deptford
War of 1812 ships of the United Kingdom